Menippidae is a family of crabs of the order Decapoda.

Genera
Menippe De Haan, 1833 
Myomenippe Hilgendorf, 1879
Pseudocarcinus H. Milne-Edwards, 1834
Ruppellioides A. Milne-Edwards, 1867
Sphaerozius Stimpson, 1858

References

External links

Eriphioidea
Decapod families